Robert Calvert, also credited as Rob Calvert, is an English saxophonist, best known for his work with Catapilla, Spontaneous Music Ensemble and numerous offshoots of Gong, including Gilli Smyth and Daevid Allen. Calvert rejects categorization of his music, into jazz or other genres, concentrating on the spirit and meaning.

Musical career
A founding member of progressive rock band Catapilla which was formed in the late 1960s, Calvert was one of one two constant members during the band's brief history, the other being guitarist Graham Wilson. He appears on both their albums, 1971's eponymous Catapilla and 1972's Changes.

In the 1970s Calvert studied improvised music with John Stevens, and Maggie Nicols and in 1975, he began appearing on John Stevens' albums, initially on free jazz band Spontaneous Music Ensemble's album SME + = SMO.  Calvert's next two albums were Somewhere in Between (1976) and Mazin Ennit (1977) both by Steven's jazz-rock band John Stevens' Away, followed Steven's album Ah! (1977). In 1994 he appeared on John Stevens Dance Orchestra's A Luta Continua, but this had been recorded in 1977.

After a break, he returned in 1989 on two Mother Gong albums The Owl and the Tree  and Wild Child, before appearing on Invisible Opera Company of Tibet's 1991 eponymous album.  Remaining in the Gong circle he appeared on Gilli Smyth's 1993 album Every Witches Way, Mother Gong's She Made the World (1993), Eye (1994) Mother Gong (1994) and Tree in Fish (1994) He toured extensively with Gong and Mothergong throughout the 1990s

Since 1994 Calvert has played and improvised with the Howley Calvert George Trio, together with John Howley (better known as a painter) on piano and vocals, and Robert George on drums.  The trio have performed widely, including tours of Poland in 1998 and 1999.

Calvert also began performing with Daevid Allen, including Allen and Harry Williamson's album Twenty Two Meanings (The Art Of Glissando Guitar Vol. 1) (1999).

Discography
With Catapilla
Catapilla (1971) Vertigo 
Changes (1972) Vertigo
With John Stevens 
SME + = SMO (1975) A Records
Somewhere in Between (1976) Vertigo
Mazin Ennit (1977) Vertigo
Ah! (1990) Konnex Records
A Luta Continua (1994) Konnex Records
With Mothergong 
The Owl and the Tree (1989) Demi Monde
Eye (1994) Voiceprint
Every Witches Way (1993) Voiceprint
She Made the World (1993) Voiceprint
Mother Gong (1994) Voiceprint
Wild Child (1997) Spalax Music
Tree in Fish (2004) Voiceprint
 With Invisible Opera Company of Tibet
Gorilla (1991) Voiceprint
 With Glo
Even as We (1995) GAS Records 
Poetry
Recoding Unamunos Quorum (1999) F..loose Productions
With Daevid Allen
Twenty Two Meanings (1999) Gliss (with Harry Williamson)  
Gentle Genie (2004) Voiceprint
Compilations
Passed Normal (1992) FOT Records (one track "Spiral Dance") 
The Best of Mother Gong (1997) Outer Music
Australia Aquaria:She (2001) NMC Music
Histories and Mysteries of Planet Gong (2004) Voiceprint

References 

Living people
English rock saxophonists
English jazz saxophonists
British male saxophonists
21st-century saxophonists
21st-century British male musicians
British male jazz musicians
Year of birth missing (living people)